Route 32 is a highway in Missouri.  Its eastern terminus is at the Mississippi River near Ste. Genevieve; its western terminus is at U.S. Route 54 in El Dorado Springs. It is currently one of the longest highways in the state. Most of the highway east of Lebanon is hilly and curvy, passing through a large part of the Missouri Ozarks.

Route 32 is one of the original Missouri highways from 1922. It originally ran only from Licking to Flat River (now Park Hills). Other portions were defined as Route 66 (El Dorado Springs to Fair Play), Route 13 (Fair Play to Buffalo), and Route 68 (Farmington to Ste. Genevieve). Route 66 replaced Route 13 to Buffalo in 1925, but by 1927 it became part of US 54. Route 32 also absorbed Route 68 in 1926 or 1927. Route 64, which had been designated in 1922 between Collins and Preston (now US 54), was extended east to Lebanon in the early 1930s, and by 1935 it had swapped alignments with US 54, becoming the El Dorado Springs-Lebanon route that now mostly carries Route 32. Route 32 was extended west to Lebanon by 1946, and it was later extended west, leaving only the Louisburg-Lebanon section of Route 64, which has since been extended west.

Route description

The highway begins at the beginning of state maintenance, at a point in the 300 block of 4th Street in Ste. Genevieve. City streets connect to a ferry providing passage across the Mississippi River to Illinois.  Just before leaving the city, the route comes to an intersection with U.S. Route 61.  Six miles further west is an interchange with Interstate 55 and eleven miles (18 km) west of the interstate is the northern junction of Route 144.  At Farmington, the highway joins U.S. Route 67 for seven miles (6 km), then it exits at Leadington and turns into four lane to Saint Joe State Park U.S. Route 67 Business.

At Caledonia, the highway turns south and forms a four-mile (6 km) concurrency with Route 21, then turns west and enters the Mark Twain National Forest.  In the national forest, the highway forms a six-mile (10 km) concurrency with Route 49.  As the highway nears the western boundary of the Mark Twain National Forest, the highway joins Route 72, the two highways will be united to the west side of Salem.  Nine miles west of Salem is the northern terminus of Route 119.

At Licking is the northern terminus of Route 137 and an intersection with U.S. Route 63.  West of Licking, Route 32 enters another section of the Mark Twain National Forest.  At Success, Route 32 turns north, joining Route 17 for four miles (6 km) then turns west again at Roby.  At Lynchburg is the northern terminus of Route 95 and Route 32 turns north.  Three miles northwest of Falcon, the highway leaves the Mark Twain National Forest.

At Lebanon, Route 32 joins Route 5 and has an interchange with Interstate 44, which also serves as the eastern terminus of Route 64.  In Lebanon, the highway turns southwest and leaves the concurrency with Route 5 and Route 64.

At Buffalo, Route 32 forms a brief concurrency with Route 73, which it joins to the terminus of Route 73 at U.S. Route 65.  The road then continues west, forming the main highway between the two county seats of Buffalo and Bolivar.  At Bolivar, the highway intersect Route 83, and then intersects Route 13.

At Fair Play, Route 32 briefly joins Route 123 and begins a northwest route to the north side of Stockton Lake where the highway passes over the dam.  At Stockton, it joins Route 39 briefly and continue west eventually reaching the northern terminus of Route 97.  At this intersection, the highway turns due north for five miles (8 km) before reaching U.S. Route 54 and ending in eastern El Dorado Springs.

History
The section of Route 32 between Route 17 and Plato was formerly designated as Route 17A.

Major intersections

References

032
Transportation in Cedar County, Missouri
Transportation in Polk County, Missouri
Transportation in Dallas County, Missouri
Transportation in Laclede County, Missouri
Transportation in Texas County, Missouri
Transportation in Dent County, Missouri
Transportation in Iron County, Missouri
Transportation in Washington County, Missouri
Transportation in St. Francois County, Missouri
Transportation in Ste. Genevieve County, Missouri